Dérive 1 (originally entitled Dérive, from the French word meaning derivative or drift) is a composition for six-part instrumental ensemble by French composer Pierre Boulez. It was composed in 1984.

Composition 

This short composition derives from two other compositions by Boulez, namely, Répons (1981) and Messagesquisse (1976–1977). It is similar to Répons in the sense that it is also a short piece for ensemble, as many others came about in the eighties, as pieces exploiting ideas that are presented in larger works by Boulez. Répons was created also as a reelaboration of musical ideas from Éclat/Multiples (1970). This working method is typical of Boulez and is also displayed in the second part of the series of Dérives, Dérive 2, which was considered to be a work in progress for years and had several revisions, expansions and reworkings.

This piece was finished on June 8, 1984, in Bath, and premiered in London on January 31, 1985, with Oliver Knussen conducting the London Sinfonietta. It was dedicated to William Glock and was later published by Universal Edition.

Structure 

This composition is in one movement and has a total duration of 7–8 minutes. It is scored for a Pierrot ensemble consisting of one flute, one clarinet in A, one violin, one cello and a piano, with the addition of a vibraphone. The score also calls for a conductor, even though the piece should probably be included in the chamber music category. Given the difficulty of the piece, most ensembles follow Boulez's instructions and use a conductor. Its structure is extracted from an idea based on the Sacher hexachord.

Dérive 1 is divided into two sections. The first section, bars 1–27, is characterized by a slow pulse ornamented by percussive and rapid arpeggios made by different instruments. The second section, bars 27–46, consists of a long crescendo which leads to a climax at bar 41. On the third beat of bar 46 a short coda ensues, repeating the same chord while using the ornaments from section one.

The tempo is "Très lent, immuable" at a maximum of  = 40. This tempo is maintained throughout the first section of the piece, spanning the first 27 bars. Then, during section two, the tempo slowly and gradually drops to  = 60 on the climax at bar 41. After that, the piece slowly goes back to the tempo primo for the coda.

Boulez frequently uses a technique that he had been developing for a long time since his Piano Sonata No. 2 which was coined by Moguillansky as "fixed-register pitches", that is, fixing some or all notes of the chromatic scale so that each note will only appear in a specific octave. This chord construction method is similar to the process of chord multiplication devised by Boulez for organizing pitch register in Le Marteau sans maître.

References 

1984 compositions
Compositions by Pierre Boulez
Music with dedications